Guðmundur Sævar Hreiðarsson (born 5 October 1960) is a retired Icelandic football goalkeeper and later manager.

References

1960 births
Living people
Gudmundur Hreidarsson
Gudmundur Hreidarsson
Gudmundur Hreidarsson
Gudmundur Hreidarsson
Gudmundur Hreidarsson
Gudmundur Hreidarsson
TuRU Düsseldorf players
Gudmundur Hreidarsson
Gudmundur Hreidarsson
Association football goalkeepers
Gudmundur Hreidarsson
Expatriate footballers in Germany
Gudmundur Hreidarsson
Gudmundur Hreidarsson
Gudmundur Hreidarsson
Iceland women's national football team managers